Per Ludvig Gösta Kaufeldt (1 August 1902 – 21 March 1956) was a Swedish football and bandy player. He won a bronze medal at the 1924 Summer Olympics.

Kaufeldt is the all-time top scorer of AIK, with 122 goals in 170 matches; he won the national football title with the club in 1923 and 1932 and a bandy title in 1931. Internationally, between 1921 and 1931 he played football (33 matches, 23 goals), ice hockey (6 matches, 0 goals) and bandy (2 matches). In retirement he worked as a coach with AIK, Hammarby, Djurgården and Örebro SK. Later he developed an unexplained pain in his legs, which led to his death at the age 53.

References

External links
profile
Profile at AIK Fotboll

1902 births
1956 deaths
Swedish footballers
Swedish bandy players
AIK Fotboll players
Montpellier HSC players
Footballers at the 1924 Summer Olympics
Olympic footballers of Sweden
Olympic bronze medalists for Sweden
Sweden international footballers
Swedish football managers
AIK Fotboll managers
Hammarby Fotboll managers
Örebro SK managers
Djurgårdens IF Fotboll managers
Olympic medalists in football
AIK Bandy players
Allsvenskan players
Medalists at the 1924 Summer Olympics
Association football forwards
Footballers from Stockholm